The 15th Filmfare Awards South Ceremony honoring the winners of the best of South Indian cinema in the year 1967 was an event held in 1968.

Awards

References

 Filmfare Magazine 1968.

General

External links
 
 

Filmfare Awards South